The 1999 Betty Barclay Cup singles was the singles event of the fifteenth edition of the Betty Barclay Cup, a WTA Tier II tournament held in Hamburg, Germany and part of the European claycourt season. Martina Hingis was the defending champion but she did not compete that year.

Venus Williams won in the final 6–0, 6–3 against Mary Pierce.

Seeds
The top four seeds received a bye to the second round.

Draw

Finals

Top half

Bottom half

Qualifying

Seeds

Qualifiers

Qualifying draw

First qualifier

Second qualifier

Third qualifier

Fourth qualifier

External links
 ITF tournament edition details

Betty Barclay Cup